Ciara Mageean (born 12 March 1992) is a middle-distance runner from Portaferry in Northern Ireland who specialises in the 1500 metres. She is a three-time European Athletics Championship medallist at the event, with bronze in 2016 and silver in 2022 outdoors, and bronze in 2019 indoors. Mageean won also silver at the 2022 Commonwealth Games.

She earned three silver medals at World and European level in the Under-18 and U20 age groups. Mageean represented Ireland at both the 2016 Rio Olympics and 2020 Tokyo Olympics. She holds four Irish records and is a multiple national champion.

Career
Ciara Mageean won silver medals at the 2009 World Youth (800 metres) and 2010 World Junior (1500 metres) Championships. She added the 1500 m silver from the 2011 European Junior Championships. Her first senior international competition saw her finish 10th in the 1500 m at the 2010 Commonwealth Games in Delhi, representing Northern Ireland.

She didn’t run at all as an under 23 due to injury which ended up with surgery.

She competed in the 1500 m event at the 2016 European Athletics Championships, winning the bronze medal. Mageean became Irish indoor record holder for the 1,500 m and the mile that season. She qualified to represent Ireland at the 2016 Summer Olympics in Rio de Janeiro, where she reached the semi-finals. Mageean was formerly coached by former Irish athlete and friend Jerry Kiernan. She credits Kiernan for her recovery after serious ankle injuries.

In 2017, Mageean moved to Manchester to work with Team New Balance, initially coached by Steve Vernon.

She placed fourth in the 1500 m at the 2018 European Championships in Berlin.

On 3 March 2019, she won the bronze medal in the event at the 2019 European Athletics Indoor Championships in Glasgow. At the World Championships held in Doha in October, she finished 10th in the final of her specialist event in a personal best time of 4:00.15.

In Bern, Switzerland, on 24 July 2020, Mageean became the first Irish woman to run sub-two minutes for the 800 m, adding to her mile and 1500 m national records. In August, she set an Irish record in the 1000 m at the Diamond League meet in Monaco, breaking by more than three seconds Sonia O'Sullivan's 27-year-old record and moving into the top 10 on the world all-time list.

Mageean tore her calf before the delayed 2020 Tokyo Olympics in 2021, and was eliminated in the heats of the 1500 m event.

She had a successful 2022 season in which she was coached by Helen Clitheroe with the Manchester-based New Balance team. Mageean chose to skip World Championships in Eugene, Oregon in July due to the Covid-19 contracted the previous month, and focused on the Birmingham Commonwealth Games and European Championships Munich 2022 held in August. This strategy was successful as she won silver medal in the 1500 m at both competitions, in each case finishing second to her Scottish rival Laura Muir. On 2 September, the 30-year-old earned her first Diamond League victory, winning her specialist event at the Brussels' Memorial Van Damme ahead of Muir. Mageean broke for the first time the 4-minute barrier and Sonia O'Sullivan's Irish national record set back in 1995 by more than two seconds. She achieved a big personal best of 3:56.63 as her previous fastest time was 4:00.15, set in the 2019 World Championships final in Qatar. Six days later, she came second in a tactical race at the Zürich Diamond Race final, finishing only behind two-time Olympic and World champion Faith Kipyegon and beating a world-class field again.

Personal life
Mageean was awarded a UCD Ad Astra Elite Athlete Scholarship and graduated from University College Dublin with a BSc in Physiotherapy in 2017.

Her cousin Conor plays hurling for Portaferry and she watched him win the 2020 Down Senior Hurling Championship.

Achievements

Personal bests
 800 metres – 1:59.69 (Bern 2020)
 1000 metres – 2:31.06 (Monaco 2020) 
 1500 metres – 3:56.63 (Brussels 2022) 
 1500 metres indoor – 4:06.42 (Boston, MA 2020) 
 One mile – 4:19.03 (Monaco 2019)
 One mile indoor – 4:28.31 (Boston, MA 2019) 
 3000 metres indoor – 8:47.23 (Manchester 2022)

Circuit wins, and National championships
 Diamond League
 2022 (1500 m): Brussels Memorial Van Damme
 Irish Athletics Championships
 800 metres: 2015, 2017, 2018, 2019
 1500 metres: 2014, 2016, 2018
 Irish Indoor Athletics Championships
 800 metres: 2016
 3000 metres: 2017, 2019

Competition record

Recognition
 Irish National Athletics Awards
 2022: Athlete of the Year, Track & Field Athlete of the Year

References

External links

 

1992 births
Living people
Female middle-distance runners from Northern Ireland
European Athletics Championships medalists
People from Portaferry
Athletes (track and field) at the 2016 Summer Olympics
Athletes (track and field) at the 2020 Summer Olympics
Olympic athletes of Ireland
Athletes (track and field) at the 2018 Commonwealth Games
Commonwealth Games competitors for Northern Ireland
Commonwealth Games silver medallists for Northern Ireland
Commonwealth Games medallists in athletics
Athletes (track and field) at the 2022 Commonwealth Games
Sportspeople from County Down
Alumni of University College Dublin
Medallists at the 2022 Commonwealth Games